Zapata Corp v. Maldonado 430 A 2d 779 (Del Sup 1979) is a US corporate law case, concerning the derivative suits in Delaware.

Facts
There was suspicion about whether a special litigation committee appointed by the board, which then dismissed the validity of a claim, was independent. The Zapata Corp was founded by George H. W. Bush.

Judgment
The Delaware Supreme Court held that a "special litigation committee" would not automatically be regarded as independent. However in this case the board could not be sued for breach of fiduciary duty, and on the facts the committee was competent to reject the demand for a derivative suit, despite being appointed by the board.

See also

United States corporate law

Notes

References

United States corporate case law